Tutazá or Tutasá, is a town and municipality in the Colombian Department of Boyacá, part of the Tundama Province, a subregion of Boyacá. Tutazá borders the municipalities Belén, Paz de Río, Sativasur and Sativanorte of the department of Boyacá and Onzaga and Coromoro of the department of Santander.

History 
Before the Spanish conquest of the Muisca on the Altiplano Cundiboyacense, Tutazá was ruled by a cacique called Tutazúa. He was loyal to the cacique Tundama from the city with the same name, currently known as Duitama. In the Chibcha language of the Muisca Tutaz(u)á means "Son of the Sun".

Although the village was already visited by missionaries from the 17th century, the official foundation was on October 6th, 1849. Simón Bolívar visited Tutazá on July 18th, 1819.

Economy 
Main economical activity of the small village are agriculture (potatoes, maize, beans, peas, barley and wheat) and livestock farming.

References 

Municipalities of Boyacá Department
Populated places established in 1849
Muisca Confederation
Muysccubun